The polar surface area (PSA) or topological polar surface area (TPSA) of a molecule is defined as the surface sum over all polar atoms or molecules, primarily oxygen and nitrogen, also including their attached hydrogen atoms.

PSA is a commonly used medicinal chemistry metric for the optimization of a drug's ability to permeate cells.  Molecules with a polar surface area of greater than 140 angstroms squared (Å2) tend to be poor at permeating cell membranes.  For molecules to penetrate the blood–brain barrier (and thus act on receptors in the central nervous system), a PSA less than 90 Å2 is usually needed.

See also
 Biopharmaceutics Classification System
 Cheminformatics
 Chemistry Development Kit
 JOELib
 Implicit solvation
 Lipinski's rule of five

References

  
 
 
 
 Ertl, P. Polar Surface Area, in Molecular Drug Properties, R. Mannhold (ed), Wiley-VCH, pp. 111–126, 2007

External links
 Interactive Polar Surface Area calculator
 Free, Programmable TPSA Calculator

Cheminformatics
Medicinal chemistry